Mary Pickering Nichols (January 29, 1829 – February 3, 1915), was an American translator of German literature, active in the last quarter of the 19th century. She was the fifth of the six children of Benjamin Ropes Nichols and her namesake Mary Pickering. She is credited with making the first complete English translation of the medieval German epic poem Gudrun in 1889.

In 1875, she translated Piano and Song: How to Teach, How to Learn, and How to Form a Judgment of Musical Performance by Friedrich Wieck, the famed instructor of his daughter Clara Schumann and son-in-law Robert Schumann. According to census records, she never married and spent most of her adult life living at 10 Chestnut Street, a block from Boston Common, with her brother Benjamin who she thanked in the preface to both translations mentioned above. She died there in 1915, at age 86.

Published works

 1875. Piano and Song: How to Teach, How to Learn, and How to Form a Judgment of Musical Performance, Translated from the German of Friederich Wieck. Boston: Lockwood, Brooks and Company. 197 pages.
 1889. Gudrun: A medieval epic, translated from the Middle High German. Houghton, Mifflin and Company: Boston and New York. 363 pages.

Notes and references

Notes

References

External links
 
 

1829 births
1915 deaths
American women writers
People from Salem, Massachusetts
German–English translators
19th-century American translators
19th-century American women